A list of comedy films released in the 1920s.

1920s

Comedy